Martin Murphy is an English former professional rugby league footballer who played in the 1960s, 1970s and 1980s.

Playing career

International honours
Martin Murphy won a cap for England while at Oldham in 1975 against France.

County Cup Final appearances
Martin Murphy played  in Oldham's 2-30 defeat by St. Helens in the 1968 Lancashire County Cup Final during the 1968–69 season at Central Park, Wigan on Friday 25 October 1968.

Honoured at Oldham
Martin Murphy is an Oldham Hall Of Fame Inductee.

References

External links
Statistics at orl-heritagetrust.org.uk

Living people
England national rugby league team players
English rugby league players
Lancashire rugby league team players
Mansfield Marksman players
Newtown Jets players
Oldham R.L.F.C. players
Rochdale Hornets players
Rugby league fullbacks
Rugby league players from Leigh, Greater Manchester
Year of birth missing (living people)